John Campbell McLeod McPherson (born c. 1855; died 14 March 1934) was a Scottish footballer, who played for Vale of Leven and Scotland.

See also
List of Scotland national football team captains

References

Sources

External links

London Hearts profile

1850s births
1934 deaths

Year of birth uncertain

Scottish footballers

Scotland international footballers

Vale of Leven F.C. players
Association footballers not categorized by position